Last man standing (LMS) or last team standing (LTS)  is a multiplayer deathmatch gameplay mode featured in some first-person shooter computer and video games, and is also the essence of battle royale games. The aim of a player in a last man standing match is to neutralize their opponents and remain the sole survivor; the basic rules followed are generally the same of the deathmatch gametype, with an important difference: respawn is limited or not allowed at all. Each player is assigned a specific number of lives per match (or just one when there is no respawn); once these lives have been expended, the player will no longer be able to return to the current match and remain as an invisible spectator until there is a winner and the LMS round is over. Within several games players are called to buy or pick up items, while other titles will have the players spawned with full weapons and ammo and there are no powerups available on the map.

Several different variations of the last man standing mode exist, with the most common being team LMS. The rules are the same of the standard LMS and the winning team is the one able to eliminate all the members of the opposing teams and keep at least one of its components alive.

The first last-man-standing video game with a shrinking play zone was the 1983 action game Bomberman.

Camping

In Last Man Standing mode, camping, which is often considered an unsocial and dishonest tactic, is highly beneficial. A player can stay in hiding until other players have killed each other, so that a majority of the players are already eliminated. The hiding player now not only has the advantage of additional lives (the player hasn't been killed as many times as other players who have been constantly moving), but also now has to fight fewer players, each of whom has the disadvantage of fewer lives. This means that the player's chances of winning are higher than others' without any skill involved. Hence, it is often considered cheating.

Camping tends to stall a game. Due to camping being highly beneficial, if everybody hides so as to wait until some players are eliminated, the game will not be allowed to proceed.

Modern games, like Unreal Tournament 2004 can detect from a players movement if they are camping. If detected, the player is first given a warning and if the player continues camping, action is taken according to the server rules (generally, a camper is removed from the game).

In vehicular combat games, camping can be prevented with a timeout clock that resets each time a player hits a rival vehicle.

Battle royale games, such as PlayerUnknown's Battlegrounds, Fortnite Battle Royale, Free Fire and ScarFall - The Royale Combat discourage camping by gradually reducing the size of the area where LMS competitors can play on, typically with a deadly energy field.  Any players who do not move to safer ground as the field closes in will suffer continuous damage and eventually die if they fail to escape it.

See also
 Battle royale game

References

Esports terminology